People with the surname Nees include:
 Christian Gottfried Daniel Nees von Esenbeck (1776–1858), German botanist and natural philosopher
 Theodor Friedrich Ludwig Nees von Esenbeck (1787–1837), German botanist and pharmacologist
 Georg Nees (1926–2016), German academic and a pioneer of computer art
 Vic Nees (1936–2013), Belgian composer and musicologist
 Michael Nees (born 1967), German football player and coach